George E. Taylor (March 21, 1838 – March 8, 1903) was a Michigan politician and judge.

Early life
On March 21, 1838, Taylor was born to Isaac and Margaret (Davis) Taylor in Oakland County, Michigan. At the age of 18, he taught school.  He started studying law at age 21 and was admitted a few years later.

Political life
Beginning with Taylor's election in 1865, he served eight years in the office of county supervisor.  Additional, he held the offices of Register of Deeds, State Senator and Flint City second ward Alderman.  He was elected as the Mayor of City of Flint in 1892 for a single 1-year term.  That same year, he was elected Judge of the Probate Court.

Post-political life
On March 8, 1903, Taylor died at his home in Flint.

References

County commissioners in Michigan
Mayors of Flint, Michigan
Michigan state senators
1838 births
1903 deaths
19th-century American judges
19th-century American politicians